Alyaksey Yuryevich Pankavets (Aleksey Yuryevich Pankovets; born 18 April 1981) is a Belarusian former professional football defender.

Honours
Gomel
Belarusian Premier League champion: 2003

Torpedo-BelAZ Zhodino
Belarusian Cup winner: 2015–16

External links 
Profile at FC Kharkiv website

1981 births
Living people
Belarusian footballers
Belarus international footballers
Belarusian expatriate footballers
Expatriate footballers in Ukraine
Belarusian expatriate sportspeople in Ukraine
Ukrainian Premier League players
FC Ataka Minsk players
FC Kommunalnik Slonim players
FC Smena Minsk players
FC Torpedo Minsk players
FC Gomel players
FC Kharkiv players
FC Minsk players
FC Dynamo Brest players
FC Dinamo Minsk players
FC Torpedo-BelAZ Zhodino players
Association football defenders
Footballers from Minsk